Hansoh Pharmaceutical Group Company Limited is a pharmaceutical company that manufactures and sells various types of medicine in mainland China. It was founded in 1995 in Lianyungang, Jiangsu Province, China, by Zhong Huijuan, who is the company's chair. Zhong and her family own 66% of the company. It is the largest psychotropic drug producer in China.

Hansoh Pharmaceutical had an initial public offering on the main board of the Hong Kong Stock Exchange on 14 June 2019.

In August 2022, it was announced that the company's stock would be added to the Hang Seng Index.

See also
 Jiangsu Hengrui Medicine

References

External links

Companies listed on the Hong Kong Stock Exchange
Companies in the Hang Seng China Enterprises Index
Chinese companies established in 1995
Civilian-run enterprises of China
Lianyungang
Pharmaceutical companies of China
2019 initial public offerings